AEK Women's Water Polo Club is the women's water polo department of the major Greek multi-sport club, AEK Sports Club, based in Athens, Greece. The club was founded in 2019 and compete in the Greek Women's Water Polo League.

History
The women's water polo team of AEK started its efforts from the A2 Greek Women's Water Polo League in the 2019–20 season. On 6 March 2020, the newly formed AEK women's water polo team gave its first official match. In their maiden season the team won the promotion to the Greek Women's Water Polo League as champion of the second division.

Honours
 A2 Greek Women's Water Polo League
 Winners (1): 2020

Current squad
Season 2020–21

Staff

See also
AEK Men's Water Polo Club

Sponsorships
Great Sponsor: Molto

References

External links

Water polo clubs in Greece
Sports clubs in Athens
Sports clubs established in 2019
2019 establishments in Greece